Anna Bradley may refer to:
Anne Bradley, the mistress of Arthur Brown senator from Utah who shot him in the early 1900s
Anna Bradley (actress)